Luke Laughs Last is a 1916 American short comedy film starring Harold Lloyd.

Cast
 Harold Lloyd as Lonesome Luke
 Snub Pollard
 Bebe Daniels
 Sammy Brooks
 Bud Jamison
 Charles Stevenson
 Harry Todd

See also
 Harold Lloyd filmography

References

External links

1916 films
1916 comedy films
Silent American comedy films
American black-and-white films
Films directed by Hal Roach
1916 short films
American silent short films
Lonesome Luke films
American comedy short films
1910s American films